John Byrne (born 20 May 1939) is a Scottish footballer who played as a winger in the Football League for Tranmere Rovers, Barnsley, Peterborough United and Northampton Town. He also played in his native Scotland for Hamilton Academical, Queen of the South and Hibernian.

References

External links

1939 births
Living people
Sportspeople from Cambuslang
Association football inside forwards
Scottish footballers
Pollok F.C. players
Hamilton Academical F.C. players
Preston North End F.C. players
Queen of the South F.C. players
Tranmere Rovers F.C. players
Hibernian F.C. players
Barnsley F.C. players
Peterborough United F.C. players
Northampton Town F.C. players
Scottish Football League players
English Football League players
Scottish expatriate footballers
Expatriate soccer players in South Africa
Association football midfielders
Footballers from South Lanarkshire